Metronet (styled METRONET) is a multi-government agency in Western Australia. It is responsible for managing extensions to Perth's public transport network. It was formed to deliver commitments made by the McGowan Government during the 2017 election campaign.

History
Metronet was first proposed as a set of rail infrastructure projects in December 2012 by the opposition Labor Party as an election commitment for the then-upcoming 2013 election. Included were new lines to Ellenbrook, Perth Airport, and eventually Wanneroo (all of which would branch from the existing Midland line), extensions of the Joondalup line to Yanchep, the Armadale line to Byford and eventually Pinjarra, and the Thornlie line to meet the Mandurah line at a new station at South Lake, and new stations at Atwell and Karnup on the Mandurah line. The extensions would be arranged into two "circle routes": a North Circle that would share parts of the Joondalup line (from Perth to a new station at Balcatta), Ellenbrook line (from Perth to Noranda), and Wanneroo line (from Noranda to a station at Alexander Drive), along with exclusive tracks and stations between Alexander Drive and Balcatta; and a South Circle that would share infrastructure with the Airport line (from Perth to Forrestfield), the Thornlie line (from Thornlie to South Lake), and the Fremantle line (from Fremantle to Perth), with exclusive tracks between Forrestfield and Thornlie, and between South Lake and Fremantle. While unsuccessful in winning government, the reelected Barnett Ministry formally approved an alternative airport link in 2014.

In August 2015, the Labor Party proposed a modified, staged version of Metronet as an election commitment for the 2017 election. This plan prioritised completion of the Airport line, the Joondalup line extension to Yanchep, the Armadale line extension to Byford, and the Thornlie line extension. This was expanded to reincorporate a rail line to Ellenbrook and Karnup station by December 2016. After the election of the McGowan Government, the Metronet multi-agency team was formed in 2017 to deliver the commitments.

Projects
Projects managed by Metronet are:

New railway lines
Building the 8.5 kilometre Forrestfield-Airport Link with stations at Redcliffe, Airport Central and High Wycombe
Building the 21 kilometre Morley–Ellenbrook line with stations at Morley, Noranda, Malaga, Whiteman Park and Ellenbrook, with provision for a future station at Bennett Springs

Railway line extensions
Byford Rail Extension: extending Armadale line services 8 kilometers to Byford
Yanchep Rail Extension: extending the Joondalup line 14.5 kilometres with stations at Alkimos, Eglinton and Yanchep
Thornlie-Cockburn Link: connecting Thornlie Station on the Thornlie Line to Cockburn Central Station on the Mandurah Line, with stations at Nicholson Road and Ranford Road

Stations

Rebuild Bayswater Station to accommodate the Midland Line, Forrestfield-Airport Link and Morley-Ellenbrook Line connections
Relocating Midland Station
Building Lakelands Station and Karnup Station on the Mandurah line
Building a multi-storey car park at Mandurah Station
Upgrades to Claremont Station and add train turnback for the Airport Line

Level crossing removals
Removing up to six level crossings on the inner Armadale and Midland Lines, along with Denny Avenue Level Crossing in Kelmscott and Caledonian Avenue Level Crossing in Maylands
Hamilton Street, Wharf Street and William Street Cannington
Mint Street, Oats Street and Welshpool Road Carlisle
Denny Avenue, Kelmscott
Caledonian Avenue, Maylands

Signalling
Introducing high capacity signalling

Rolling stock

Introducing 41 six-car C-series trains. In August 2019, it was announced Alstom Transport Australia would be the supplier for the 246 new railcars, each with the capacity to hold 1,200 passengers. The tender mandated the railcars contained 50% locally manufactured content. The factory is being built in Bellevue but will be operated by Alstrom. Back in 2017, 13 new six-car sets were to built at $410 million but was expanded in the 2019 announcement to 41 at a total $1.3 billion.

See also
Transperth
New MetroRail

References

Public transport in Perth, Western Australia
Statutory agencies of Western Australia
2017 establishments in Australia